Aaron Patrick (born December 21, 1996) is an American football outside linebacker for the Denver Broncos of the National Football League (NFL). He played college football at Eastern Kentucky.

College career
Patrick was a member of the Eastern Kentucky Colonels for five seasons. Patrick finished his collegiate career with 27.5 sacks, which are the second-most in school history.

Professional career

Jacksonville Jaguars
Patrick was signed with the Jacksonville Jaguars to their practice squad on December 14, 2020. He he signed a reserve/futures contract with the team on January 4, 2021. Patrick was waived on August 31, 2021, during final roster cuts but was resigned to the team's practice squad on September 9.

Denver Broncos
The Denver Broncos signed Patrick to their active roster off of the Jaguars practice squad on September 23, 2021.

In Week 6 of the 2022 season, Patrick suffered a torn ACL and was placed on injured reserve on October 21, 2022.

References

External links
Eastern Kentucky Colonels bio
Denver Broncos bio

1996 births
Living people
American football linebackers
Jacksonville Jaguars players
Denver Broncos players
Eastern Kentucky Colonels football players
Players of American football from Ohio